The 1995–96 Meistriliiga season was the sixth season of the Meistriliiga, the top level of ice hockey in Estonia. Five teams participated in the league, and Kreenholm Narva won the championship.

Standings

External links
Season on hockeyarchives.info

Meistriliiga
Meist
Meistriliiga (ice hockey) seasons